RSA may refer to:

Organizations

Academia and education
Rabbinical Seminary of America, a yeshiva in New York City
Regional Science Association International (formerly the Regional Science Association), a US-based learned society
Renaissance Society of America, a scholarly organization based in New York City
Rhetoric Society of America, an academic organization for the study of rhetoric
Royal Scottish Academy, a Scottish institute of the Arts
Royal Society of Arts, formally the Royal Society for the encouragement of Arts, Manufactures and Commerce, a British institution

Military
Redstone Arsenal, a United States Army post adjacent to Huntsville, Alabama
Royal New Zealand Returned and Services' Association, an organization for the welfare of veterans of New Zealand's military
Royal School of Artillery, a British Army training establishment for artillery warfare
Royal Signals Association, an organization for serving and retired members of the Royal Corps of Signals, of the British Army

Other organizations
RSA Insurance Group (Royal and Sun Alliance), United Kingdom
RSA Security, a US network security company
Rehabilitation Services Administration, a US Department of Education agency
Retirement Systems of Alabama, US
Ridley Scott Associates, a UK film company
Road Safety Authority, Ireland
Russian Ski Association

Places
Republic of South Africa
Santa Rosa Airport (Argentina), in La Pampa province (IATA code RSA)

In science and technology

Biology, organic chemistry, and medicine
Respiratory sinus arrhythmia, the heart rate variation due to respiration
Retrosynthetic analysis, in organic chemistry
Rsa RNA, partially characterised non-coding RNA from Staphylococcus aureus

Cryptography and security
RSA (cryptosystem) (Rivest–Shamir–Adleman), for public-key encryption
RSA Conference, annual gathering
RSA Factoring Challenge, for factoring a set of semi-prime numbers
RSA numbers, with two prime numbers as factors

Other uses in science and technology
RSA (missile), a Swiss-developed surface-to-air missile system
Rational Software Architect, part of IBM Rational Application Developer
Remote supervisor adapter, an out-of-band management interface on IBM servers
Revolver Stechkina-Avraamova, a designation of the Russian OTs-01 Kobalt revolver
Roentgen stereophotogrammetric analysis, also called radiostereometric analysis, a method of calculating 3D orientation using X-ray images

Other uses
Ray Steadman-Allen, a composer of music
Repressive state apparatuses, a concept in Louis Althusser's philosophy
Responsible Service of Alcohol, alcohol server training in several Australian states
, a French in-work welfare benefit
New Hampshire Revised Statutes Annotated, an entire body of laws
Runway safety area, or runway end safety area